Trương Ngọc Tuấn (born 23 October 1976) is a Vietnamese swimmer. He competed in the men's 200 metre backstroke event at the 1996 Summer Olympics.

References

External links
 

1976 births
Living people
Vietnamese male swimmers
Olympic swimmers of Vietnam
Swimmers at the 1996 Summer Olympics
Place of birth missing (living people)